Glen D. Riley Observatory  is an astronomical observatory owned and operated by Naperville Astronomical Association.  It was founded 1973 and located in Naperville, Illinois (US). Partnered with the DuPage Valley Observatory, which is equipped with a custom 12.5" astrograph for video imaging; together, they make up the association's "Astronomy Education Center".  The facility is used both by the organization's members and for extensive public outreach; see their website for information on scheduled public programs and for setting up observing sessions for youth groups.

See also 
List of astronomical observatories

References

External links
Riley Observatory Clear Sky Clock Forecasts of observing conditions.

Astronomical observatories in Illinois
Buildings and structures in Naperville, Illinois
Buildings and structures in DuPage County, Illinois